Labis is a federal constituency in Segamat District, Johor, Malaysia, that has been represented in the Dewan Rakyat since 1974.

The federal constituency was created in the 1974 redistribution and is mandated to return a single member to the Dewan Rakyat under the first past the post voting system.

Demographics

History

Polling districts 
According to the gazette issued on 31 October 2022, the Labis constituency has a total of 34 polling districts.

Representation history

Note: 1Noted that in 1984 redelineation exercise this Labis constituency is now shifted south to Labis city centre from former Segamat constituency, not Segamat, Johor  in Segamat District where now renamed as Segamat.

State constituency

Current state assembly members

Local governments

Election results

References

Johor federal constituencies